"Rise 'n' Shine" is a single by Canadian country music artist Dick Damron. The song debuted at number 41 on the RPM Country Tracks chart on April 24, 1971. It peaked at number 1 on July 17, 1971.

Chart performance

References

1971 singles
Dick Damron songs
1971 songs
Songs written by Dick Damron